Theresa Raizenberg is a well-known LGBTQ community equal rights activist. Together with Midi Achmat and Sally Gross, she was awarded the 2003 Galactic/Allison Masters Community Award. She is also one of the founding members of TAC. She has written in various activist journals and is active with the Gay and Lesbian Memory in Action (GALA) organization.

References

Year of birth missing (living people)
Living people
South African LGBT rights activists
Place of birth missing (living people)
Nationality missing
South African writers